Astragalus lentiformis is a species of milkvetch known by the common name lens-pod milkvetch. It is endemic to the Sierra Nevada in eastern Plumas County, California, where it grows in chaparral scrub and coniferous forests.

Description
Astragalus lentiformis is a small perennial herb forming a patch of spreading stems 10 to 20 centimeters long. The leaves are less than 4 centimeters in length and are made up of several narrow leaflets. Stem and leaves have a thin coat of fine grayish hairs.

The inflorescence is a small cluster of 5 to 10 off-white or pale yellow flowers each a few millimeters long. The fruit is a lens-shaped legume pod less than a centimeter long which is hairy and papery in texture.

See also
California interior chaparral and woodlands

References

External links
 Calflora Database: Astragalus lentiformis (Lens pod milkvetch)
Jepson Manual eFlora (TJM2) treatment of Astragalus lentiformis 
USDA Plants Profile for Astragalus lentiformis (lens pod milkvetch)
UC Photos gallery: Astragalus lentiformis

lentiformis
Endemic flora of California
Flora of the Sierra Nevada (United States)
Natural history of the California chaparral and woodlands
Natural history of Plumas County, California
~